Maki Esther Ortiz Domínguez (born 23 September 1962) is a Mexican politician affiliated with the National Action Party (PAN). She currently serves as Mayoress of Reynosa, and she is the first woman in the history of the city elected to the position, she also became the first mayoress to be re-elected for a consecutive second term. She also served as  Senator of the LXII Legislature of the Mexican Congress representing Tamaulipas. She also served as Deputy during the LIX Legislature.

See also
 List of presidents of Reynosa Municipality

References

1962 births
Living people
People from Reynosa
Women members of the Senate of the Republic (Mexico)
Members of the Senate of the Republic (Mexico)
Members of the Chamber of Deputies (Mexico)
National Action Party (Mexico) politicians
21st-century Mexican politicians
21st-century Mexican women politicians
Women members of the Chamber of Deputies (Mexico)
Politicians from Tamaulipas
Monterrey Institute of Technology and Higher Education alumni